Salme Pekkala-Dutt (: Salme Anette Murrik) (29 August 1888 – 30 August 1964) was an Estonian-British communist politician, wife of Rajani Palme Dutt.

The Finnish-Estonian author Hella Wuolijoki was her elder sister. Murrik was also grandaunt of Finnish Social Democratic politician Erkki Tuomioja.

Salme Murrik was born in Helme Parish, Governorate of Livonia, Russian Empire (present-day Estonia), and spent her childhood in Valga. She was expelled from the A.S. Pushkin Gymnasium in Tartu due to her participation in the Revolution of 1905, and moved to Moscow, and to Siberia, and Finland before settling in Britain. Her first husband was notable Finnish left wing politician Eino Pekkala, brother of Mauno Pekkala.

During the early years of the Communist Party of Great Britain, Murrik, a Comintern agent, acted as Dutt's link to Moscow. Salme Murrik had been directed to Britain on Lenin's orders to participate in forming the Communist Party there. She remained an ardent admirer of Stalin even after Khruschchev's 1956 secret speech critical of Stalin's cult of personality.

Salme Dutt's treatment of the Chartist movement, When England Arose, was published in 1939. A collection of poems, entitled Lucifer and Other Poems, was published in London in 1966. Salme Dutt died in the city in 1964.

Notes

References
Lausti.com
 Valgark.ee

Bibliography
John Callaghan “Rajani Palme Dutt, British communism, and the Communist Party of India″ - Journal of Communist Studies and Transition Politics, Volume 6, Issue 1 March 1990, pages 49 – 70  
Andrew Thorpe The British Communist Party and Moscow 1920-43, Manchester University Press, 308 s., Midsomer Norton 2000
Erkki Tuomioja Häivähdys punaista Helsinki:Tammi, 2006 (Swedish translation: Ett stänk av rött: två systrar i revolutionens tjänst Stockholm, 2008, Estonian: Õrnroosa: Hella Wuolijoe ja Salme Dutti elu revolutsiooni teenistuses, Tallinn, 2006, the English manuscript is entitled A delicate shade of pink)

1888 births
1964 deaths
People from Tõrva Parish
People from Kreis Fellin
Estonian communists
Communist Party of Great Britain members
British Comintern people
Anti-revisionists
Emigrants from the Russian Empire to the United Kingdom